Moung Ruessei is a small town and seat of Moung Ruessei District in Battambang Province, central-western Cambodia. The town is connected to Svay Don Kêv several kilometres to the east via the National Highway 5. Highway 149 connects it to Phumi Sakor in the north.

Towns in Cambodia
Moung Ruessei District
Populated places in Battambang province